Ramachandran Govindarasu also known as Singai G. Ramachandran (born 11 December 1987) is an Indian politician from Tamil Nadu, affiliated with All India Anna Dravida Munnetra Kazhagam (AIADMK). He is currently serving as the Secretary of the Information Technology Wing of the AIADMK, was appointed by Jayalalithaa, then Chief Minister of Tamil Nadu in March 2016.

Early life and education 
He did his schooling from Perks Matriculation Higher Secondary School and completed his graduation in electronics and communications engineering from PSG College of Technology, Coimbatore. He worked for three years at Focus Academy for Career Enhancement before joining the IIM Ahmedabad to pursue an PGDM in 2013.

In an interview with Rediff.com, he said that he joined the party when he was 18.

Career 
On March 23, 2016, Ramachandran was appointed as the secretary of the IT wing of AIADMK by party supremo and Chief Minister, Jayalalithaa. He opted out of placements and started working for party.

Under his leadership, the IT Wing contributed to the party's victory in the Tamil Nadu Assembly Elections 2016. After the death of CM J.Jayalalitha, he was among the first party secretaries to lend support to the O. Panneerselvam faction.

In February 2017, he was expelled from the party by V. K. Sasikala for alleged anti-party activities. However, his removal comes after he offered support to O Panneerselvam."

After the merger of the two factions, he was re-appointed as the AIADMK IT Wing State Secretary.

Ramachandran was also active in student politics. He served as general secretary for Students Affairs Council (SAC) at IIM Ahmedabad.

Positions held

Personal life
He is the son of Singai Govindarasu, who was an MLA in Singanallur from 1991 to 1996.

References 

All India Anna Dravida Munnetra Kazhagam politicians
Indian Institute of Management Ahmedabad alumni
Living people
1987 births
People from Coimbatore district